Sreekrishnapuram is a town within the Ottappalam Tehsil of Palakkad district in the state of Kerala, India.

Demographics
 Total population: 27,597

As of the 2001 Indian census, Sreekrishnapuram -I had a population of 13204 with 6246 males and 6958 females. As of the 2001 Indian census, Sreekrishnapuram -II had a population of 14393 with 6734 males and 7659 females.

Education
The town has a government Engineering College established in 1999 and several schools:
 Government Engineering College, Sreekrishnapuram
 HSS Sreekrishnapuram
 St. Dominic's Convent English Medium School
 AUPS Sreekrishnapuram

Places of interest
 Lt. Col. Niranjan Memorial I.T.I., Elambulassery
Om Sharavanabhava Matham (Math)

References

Villages in Palakkad district